Lieutenant Colonel Charles Kochersperger (18261867) was a Union Army officer with the 71st Pennsylvania Infantry Volunteers Regiment. He was the unit's second-in-command at the 1863 Battle of Gettysburg and its commander at the 1864 Battle of the Wilderness.

Kochersperger was born in Philadelphia, Pennsylvania, on February 8, 1826, the eldest son of Charles Kochersperger by his wife Jane,  McDonnell. He was married there on July 4, 1849, to Sarah Ann Bozorth of the same place.

In 1855, he purchased a private mail delivery company, Blood's Penny Post, which issued its own postage stamps and competed directly with the United States Postal Service. It would eventually be shut down by a Supreme Court of the United States decision.

In 1861, he enlisted with the 71st Pennsylvania Volunteers Regiment. He rose to second-in-command by Gettysburg and full command for the Wilderness, where he was severely wounded. Kochersperger died from the long-term effects of his war wounds in Philadelphia on December 27, 1867, and was buried on Dec. 29 at the city's Odd Fellows Cemetery, now defunct.

His widow survived him by 45 years, dying in Darby, Pennsylvania, on April 14, 1912.

References

National Archives and Records Administration [NARA], Washington DC, Civil War Pension records, file No. 160962, 141514
Pickett's Charge. The Last attack at Gettysburg, by Earl J. Hess, 2001 University of North Carolina Press
Philadelphia History, volume 2, by S. P. Wetherill [Mrs.], Philadelphia 1916, page 233
Annals of Philadelphia and Pennsylvania, by John Fanning Watson, Willis Pope Hazard, Philadelphia 1891, page 477
The Museum, by Edwin Atlee Berber, Philadelphia 1885, page 10
http://www.kochersperger-genealogie.de

1826 births
1867 deaths
Military personnel from Philadelphia
People of Pennsylvania in the American Civil War
Union Army officers
Burials in Pennsylvania